Johnny Ryan (16 August 1914 – 5 January 1997) was an Irish sportsperson. He played hurling with his local club Moycarkey–Borris and was a member of the Tipperary senior inter-county team in the 1930s and 1940s. Ryan won an All-Ireland winners' medal with Tipp in 1937, as well as three Munster titles in 1937, 1941 and 1945.

References

1914 births
1997 deaths
All-Ireland Senior Hurling Championship winners
Moycarkey-Borris hurlers
Munster inter-provincial hurlers
Tipperary inter-county hurlers